Most British police officers (except in Northern Ireland) are not routinely armed. Instead, they rely on specially trained Authorised Firearms Officers (AFO) to attend incidents where firearms are necessary. Specialist Firearms Officers are usually trained to a higher standard than AFOs, because they are likely to be required to enter besieged premises. The vast majority of firearms used by British police are semi-automatic. Police use of force regarding firearms was governed by the Association of Chief Police Officers (ACPO, dissolved 2015).

Weapons used by Home Office police forces
Firearms used by police officers vary between police forces in the UK. The Chief Constable and Police authority of each force decides the number of firearms officers and type of police firearms available. In 2010, 5.56mm calibre carbines were widely introduced in case of an attack similar to the 2008 Mumbai attacks.

Firearms issued to Authorised Firearms Officers include:

Pistols

 Glock series
 Glock 17 (most commonly issued pistol among all Home Office police forces).
 Glock 17M (Glock 17 variant issued to firearms officers of the Metropolitan Police).
 Glock 19 (issued to South Yorkshire Police as a variant to the Glock 17 pistol, as well as to firearms officers of the Metropolitan Police).
 Glock 19M (Glock 19 variant issued to firearms officers of the Metropolitan Police).
 Glock 26 (issued to plainclothes and firearms officers of the Metropolitan Police).
 SIG Sauer P226 (issued to Sussex Police).
 SIG Sauer P229 (issued to West Midlands Police).
 SIG Sauer P320 (issued to West Midlands Police to replace the P229 and Lancashire Constabulary).
 SIG Sauer P250 (issued to Cleveland Police and Essex Police)
 SIG Pro (used by Essex Police)
 Walther P99 (used by Nottinghamshire Police).

Submachine guns 

 Heckler & Koch MP5 (used by various forces, including the Metropolitan Police since 1977, Thames Valley Police, Greater Manchester Police, Cheshire Police and North Wales Police Alliance Armed Policing Unit, Sussex Police, Surrey Police and West Midlands Police; includes fixed stock A2, retractable stock A3, and compact MP5K variants, with the Metropolitan Police also having access to suppressed versions. While normally issued in semi-automatic MP5SF form, select-fire versions are available.).
 Heckler & Koch MP7

Rifles 

 Heckler & Koch G36 variants (used by multiple forces including the Metropolitan Police, City of London Police, Police Scotland, North Yorkshire Police, West Yorkshire Police, Cleveland Police, Dyfed–Powys Police, Bedfordshire Police, Kent Police, Northumbria Police, South Wales Police, Northamptonshire Police, Surrey Police, Cheshire Police and North Wales Police Alliance Armed Policing Unit, Essex Police, Lancashire Constabulary, Norfolk Constabulary, Gloucestershire Constabulary, Merseyside Police, and Greater Manchester Police).
 LMT Defender (used by Hampshire and Thames Valley Police Armed Response)
 LMT LM7 (used by Northumbria Police)
 Heckler & Koch G3 G3-SG1 and PSG-1 variant (used for sniping roles), G3K variant used by Metropolitan Police.
 HK53 (used by Cumbria Constabulary)
 SIG SG 550 (551 variant) (used by West Mercia Police). (552 variant) (previously used by Derbyshire Police) and (553 variant) (used by West Yorkshire Police and Staffordshire Police).
 SIG Sauer SIG516 (increasingly being used by police around the UK including WMP).
 SIG Sauer SIG716 (7.62x51mm version of SIG516, issued to firearms officers of the Metropolitan Police).
 HK416 (Used by West Mercia Police and Cumbria Constabulary)
 SIG Sauer MCX (used by various forces' Counter Terrorist Specialist Firearms Officers (CTSFOs), Specialist Firearms Officers (SFOs) and Authorised Firearms Officers (AFOs) including the Metropolitan Police, Derbyshire Constabulary, West Yorkshire Police, West Midlands Police, Police Scotland, Northumbria Police, and Lancashire Constabulary.)
 SIG MCX Rattler (issued to firearms officers of the Metropolitan Police).
 HK417 Marksman Rifle (used by Surrey Police and Essex Police)
 Ruger Precision Rifle (used by Northumbria Police)
 Remington 700 variant (used by police snipers during the Raoul Moat manhunt)
 Accuracy International Arctic Warfare (7.62x51mm and .338 variants issued to firearms officers of the Metropolitan Police; also used by Essex Police and Cheshire Police and North Wales Police Alliance Armed Policing Unit)
 Tikka T3 (used by Essex Police)

In addition to the issued weapons above, AK-47 variants have been seen in use with Metropolitan Police officers roleplaying as gunmen during CTSFO training exercises.

Shotguns
 Remington 870 shotgun (used by Greater Manchester Police).
 Benelli M3 Super 90 (used by Metropolitan Police firearms officers since 2004).
 Benelli Nova and Supernova (used by Essex Police)
 Unidentified pump action shotguns used by Cheshire Police and North Wales Police Alliance Armed Policing Unit and West Midlands Police

Riot guns

 Heckler & Koch HK69A1 L104A1/A2 37mm riot gun for baton rounds (used by Metropolitan Police, Kent Police, South Wales Police, Dyfed–Powys Police, Hampshire and Thames Valley Police Armed Response, Lancashire Constabulary, Northumbria Police, and Essex Police; used with attenuating energy projectile and discriminating irritant projectile rounds)

Grenades
 Stun grenade

Northern Ireland
Unlike territorial police forces in England, Scotland and Wales, as well as the Garda Síochána in the neighbouring Republic of Ireland, all Police Service of Northern Ireland officers are trained to use firearms and are routinely armed while on duty, as were those of the preceding Royal Ulster Constabulary; many officers also carry firearms while off duty. Historically, RUC officers were issued with the Ruger Speed-Six revolver from 1979 onwards and had access to the Sterling submachine gun and the Ruger AC-556 select-fire rifle until these were replaced by the Heckler & Koch MP5 submachine gun and the Heckler & Koch G3 and Heckler & Koch HK33 rifles between 1992 and 1995, with the PSNI inheriting the Speed-Six revolvers and the Heckler & Koch weapons upon its formation in 2001; the Speed-Six revolvers were subsequently superseded by the Glock 17 pistol from 2002 onwards, while Heckler & Koch G36 variants were acquired to supplement earlier Heckler & Koch weapons. L104 riot guns are available for crowd control purposes.

Weapons used by non-Home Office police forces

British Transport Police
Most British Transport Police officers are unarmed. British Transport police AFOs carry:
 Glock 17 pistol
 LMT CQB 10.5" SBR carbine (may be fitted with suppressor)

Belfast Harbour Police
Like the PSNI, Belfast Harbour Police officers are issued the Glock 17 pistol.

Belfast International Airport Constabulary
Like the PSNI, officers of the Belfast International Airport Constabulary are issued the Glock 17 pistol whilst on duty. Officers are also authorised to carry Heckler & Koch MP5s, similar to those used by the PSNI prior to the adoption of the Heckler & Koch G36.

Civil Nuclear Constabulary
Civil Nuclear Constabulary (CNC) officers are routinely armed while carrying out their duties. CNC officers carry:
Glock 17
Heckler & Koch MP5-SF
Heckler & Koch G36K and C semi-automatic variants (Fitted with integral ZF 3×4° sights, EOTech holographic sights, or ACOG telescopic sights)
 LMT LM7
CNC officers also operate the armament on board the ships of Pacific Nuclear Transport Limited, which specialise in transporting spent nuclear fuel and reprocessed uranium on behalf of the British Nuclear Fuels organisation. Such ships have an on-board escort of armed police. The Civil Nuclear Constabulary use a range of heavier weapons up to automatic cannon of 30mm calibre deployed on the ships.

Ministry of Defence Police
All Ministry of Defence Police officers are required to pass a firearms module during training (with marine units receiving additional firearms training that is specific to their role) and are routinely armed unless the are posted to Crime Command.
 Sig Sauer P229 Slowly being replaced by the Glock 17 to standardise with Home Office Police Services and the Armed Forces]
 Heckler & Koch MP7: General issue nationwide. Introduced in 2005 to replace the Browning HiPower, SA80 and MP5. The SF (Single Fire) Variant was produced to meet the exclusive request by MDP as its only user worldwide. Planned to be phased out of most roles and replaced with the Colt Canada C8.
 Colt Canada C8: Issued to Officers based at AWE, the Special Escort Group and Tactical Firearms Unit.
  L85A2 Used by officers at HMNB Clyde and RNAD Coulport. Planned to be removed from service and replaced by the Colt Canada C8.
 LM7

Historical firearms
In the past, police have been issued:

 Webley Revolver
 Beretta M1951 selected as the standard sidearm of the Metropolitan Police's Special Branch and Royalty Protective Officers in 1954  
 Lee–Enfield rifles
 Sten Gun
 Sterling Mark 6 "Police"—semi-automatic-only version of the Sterling smg
 Smith & Wesson Model 10 revolver used in the 1970s and 1980s by the Metropolitan Police and Surrey Constabulary among others.
 Smith & Wesson Model 36 revolver used in the 1970s by Surrey Constabulary detectives and Special Branch.
 Parker Hale Safari sniper rifle used in the 1970s and 1980s by Surrey Constabulary.
 Browning Hi-Power handgun used in the 1980s by Surrey Constabulary.
 Ruger Mini-14 rifle used in the 1980s by Surrey Constabulary.
 Remington 870 used by the Metropolitan Police prior to the adoption of the Benelli M3 in 2004 and in the 1980s by Surrey Constabulary.
 Smith & Wesson Mod 66 .357 Magnum revolver used in the past by West Mercia Constabulary 
 Steyr AUG variant used by Gloucestershire Constabulary.
 HK53 used by Strathclyde Police prior to being merged with all other Scottish police forces into Police Scotland
 MP5 used by West Midlands Police prior to the adoption of the SIG Sauer SIG516
 G36 used by West Midlands Police prior to the adoption of the SIG Sauer SIG516

References

Law enforcement in the United Kingdom
Law enforcement-related lists